St. Philip's Cathedral may refer to:

 St. Philip's Cathedral, San Felipe, Chile
 St. Philip the Apostle Cathedral, Puerto Plata, Dominican Republic
 St Philip's Cathedral, Birmingham, England
 Cathedral of St. Philip the Apostle (Arecibo, Puerto Rico)
 Episcopal Cathedral of Saint Philip (Atlanta, Georgia), United States
 St. Philip the Apostle Cathedral, San Felipe, Venezuela